Android 2.x may refer to:

 Android Eclair (2.0 – 2.1)
 Android Froyo (2.2 – 2.2.3)
 Android Gingerbread (2.3 – 2.3.7)

2.